Ganjeh is a village in Darbandrud Rural District, in the Central District of Asadabad County, Hamadan Province, Iran. At the 2006 census, its population was 169, in 44 families.

References 

Populated places in Asadabad County